Al-Jaish Sports Club is a professional football club based in Damascus, Syria that competes in the Syrian Premier League, founded in 1947. The club plays at the Al-Fayhaa Stadium. The team colors are red and white. Al-Jaish is considered the most successful football club in the country and one of the most successful in the region, having won 17 official league titles, 9 Syrian Cups and 3 Syrian Super Cups, being the record holder in the number of league titles. Between 2015 and 2019, Al-Jaish won five consecutive league titles. Al-Jaish have won the domestic double four times.

In 2004, Al-Jaish became the first Syrian club to ever win the AFC Cup, defeating Al-Wahda SC in the final. Al-Jaish have participated in the group stage of the AFC Champions League and have previously reached the finals of the Arab Club Champions Cup, Arab Cup Winners' Cup twice and Arab Super Cup once.

Al-Jaish Sports Club also takes part in other sports like basketball, handball, volleyball and rugby sevens.

History
The club was founded in 1947. It is the most successful club in the country. In its history, the club was the champion of Syria seventeen times. They also won nine Syrian Cups in 1967, 1986, 1997, 1998, 2000, 2002, 2004, 2014 and 2018, and three Syrian Super Cups in 2013, 2018 and 2019. 

In 2004, the club also achieved international success. In the AFC Cup finals they defeated on aggregate Al-Wahda Damascus (3:2, 0:1).

Honours

Domestic
Syrian League: 17
Champion: 1972–73, 1975–76, 1978–79, 1984–85, 1985–86, 1997–98, 1998–99, 2000–01, 2001–02, 2002–03, 2009–10, 2012–13, 2014–15, 2015–16, 2016–17, 2017–18, 2018–19

Syrian Cup: 9
Champion: 1967, 1986, 1997, 1998, 2000, 2002, 2004, 2014, 2018

Syrian Super Cup: 3
Champion: 2013, 2018, 2019

Continental
AFC Cup: 1
Champion: 2004

Regional
Arab Club Champions Cup
Runner-up: 1999, 2000
Arab Cup Winners' Cup
Runner-up: 1998, 1999
Arab Super Cup
Runner-up: 1999

Stadiums

Al-Fayhaa Stadium

Al-Fayhaa Stadium is located in the city center of Damascus, Syria. In April 2020, it was converted into an all-seater stadium with a capacity of 12,000 seats.

Abbasiyyin Stadium

Abbasiyyin Stadium is located in the centre of Damascus, directly behind the district Al-Sufanyya. After the most recent renovation in March 2011, Abbasiyyin Stadium was turned into an all-seater stadium and the capacity was reduced to 30,000 seats.

Colours and kits

Shirt sponsor & kit manufacturer

Performance in AFC competitions
AFC Champions League: 3 appearances
2002–03: Qualifying West – 4th Round
2005: Group Stage
2022: Qualifying Stage

AFC Cup: 10 appearances
2004: Champion
2010: Group Stage
2011: Group Stage
2012: Group Stage
2014: Group Stage
2015: Quarterfinals
2016: Quarterfinals
2017: Group Stage
2018: Group Stage
2019: West Asian Zonal semifinals 
2020: Cancelled

Asian Cup Winners Cup: 1 appearance
1999–00: Second Round

Performance in UAFA competitions
Arab Club Champions Cup: 9 appearances
1986: 5th
1999: Runner-up
2000: Runner-up
2003: Group Stage
2004: 1st Round
2007: Round of 32
2017: Qualifying Play-off
2019: 1st Round
2020: 1st Round

Arab Cup Winners' Cup: 3 appearances
1998: Runner-up
1999: Runner-up
2001: Semifinals

Arab Super Cup: 3 appearances
1999: Runner-up
2000: 3rd
2001: 3rd

Current squad
As of 11 June 2022

Notable/former players
For all current and former Al-Jaish SC players with a Wikipedia article see Al-Jaish Damascus players.

 Ismail Camara
 Hassouneh Al-Sheikh
 Ahmed Hayel
 Tudor Mihail
 Emmanuel Figo Kabia
 Yasser Akra
 Jehad Al Baour
 Majed Al Haj
 Mohamad Afa Al Rifai
 Ahmad Al Salih
 Mohamed Bairouti
 Raghdan Shehadeh
 Said Bayazid
 Ahmad Azzam
 Nihad Haj Moustafa
 Jomard Moussa
 Maher Al Sayed
 Feras Esmaeel
 Abdullah Habbar
 Kawa Hesso
 Mutaz Kailouni
 Burhan Sahyouni
 Hazem Harba
 Hugo Acosta
 Phillimon Chepita
 Zachariah Simukonda
 Basel Abdoulfattakh

References

External links
 Official website

Football clubs in Syria
Association football clubs established in 1947
Sport in Damascus
1947 establishments in Syria
AFC Cup winning clubs
Military association football clubs